The basketball tournaments of NCAA Season 86 refers to the basketball events of the Philippine National Collegiate Athletic Association (NCAA)'s 2010–11 season.

The San Beda Red Lions won all of their sixteen elimination round games to qualify for the finals outright needing to win twice against their opponent, which has to win thrice. The second-seed and defending champion San Sebastian Stags won the stepladder series against the JRU Heavy Bombers, which had earlier beaten the Mapua Cardinals. The Red Lions completed their 18–0 game sweep of the season when they won against the Stags in double digits to win in the second finals where the finalists were the champions of the two immediate seasons met since 2005. San Beda's American center Sudan Daniel won both season and finals Most Valuable Player (MVP) honors.

In the juniors' division, the San Beda Red Cubs lost only two games in the elimination round: one against the Letran Squires via technicality, and the other their last elimination round game against the San Sebastian Staglets which won via overtime. The Red Cubs and the Staglets defeated the Squires and the UPHSD Altalettes respectively in the semifinals to qualify for the finals. Like in the seniors' division, the Finals series was between two preceding champions; the Red Cubs also won double-digit games against the Staglets to successfully defend their championship. San Beda's Baser Amer won both season and finals MVP awards.

Seniors' tournament

Teams

Preseason
JRU Heavy Bombers head coach Ariel Vanguardia was let go by the school after their semifinals loss against the San Sebastian Stags; former Heavy Bomber Vergel Meneses was hired to replace him.  Arellano Chiefs' former head coach Leo Isaac takes over from Junjie Ablan. Isaac previously coached the Mapúa Cardinals from 2007–09; however he held the position while still Arellano head coach, at the time playing for the NCRAA. Meanwhile, Aric del Rosario is retained as the basketball commissioner.

The San Sebastian Stags emerged as the team to beat prior the season, finishing fourth at the 2009 Philippine Collegiate Championship, and winning the CHED Games, the Philippine Basketball League and more recently, the Fil-Oil/Flying V Championship.

Elimination round

Team standings

Match-up results

Scores

Bracket

Stepladder semifinals

First round

Second round

Finals
San Beda has to win twice, while their opponent has to win thrice to win the championship.

Finals Most Valuable Player:

Awards
The awards were given prior to Game 2 of the Seniors' Finals at the Araneta Coliseum.
Most Valuable Player:  
Coach Of The Year: 
Mythical Five:
 

Rookie of the Year: 
Most Improved Player: 
Defensive Player of the Year:

Players of the Week

Juniors' tournament

Elimination round

Team standings

Match-up results

Scores

Fourth seed playoffs
These are a series of one-game playoffs to determine the #4 seed. LSGH received a bye to the final round due to owning a superior tiebreaker.

First round

Second round

Bracket

Semifinals

Finals

Finals Most Valuable Player:

Awards

Most Valuable Player: 
Rookie of the Year: 
Mythical Five:

 

Most Improved Player:
Defensive Player of the Year:

Broadcast notes
Studio 23 carried all games live. SkyCable Channel 166 (Balls HD) aired the finals series on high definition live, with Balls SD airing the replays. The Filipino Channel broadcast the games outside the Philippines.

See also
UAAP Season 73 basketball tournaments

References

External links
NCAA official website
UBelt.com
NCAA basketball at Inboundpass.com

84
2010–11 in Philippine college basketball